"Anytime, Any Place, Anywhere" is the 1950 debut single by Joe Morris and His Orchestra.  Joe Morris' debut single was his most successful on three entries on the R&B chart.  "Anytime, Any Place, Anywhere" featured vocals by Laurie Tate and hit number one on the R&B charts.

References

1950 debut singles
1950 songs